Higbie Avenue was a  railroad station along the Atlantic Branch of the Long Island Rail Road, in Queens, New York City. The station was located on 140th Avenue (formerly Higbie Avenue) and Edgewood Avenue in the Springfield section of Queens, New York City between Locust Manor and Laurelton stations.

History

Springfield station 
The South Side Railroad of Long Island established service on Springfield Boulevard on the Atlantic Branch on October 28, 1867 but did not install a station house until August or September 1871. The station was moved to Laurelton in August 1876, but kept the name "Springfield." In 1905, the Atlantic Branch was electrified, but following the development of the area by the Laurelton Land Company, the station was torn down in 1906, and split between Laurelton and Higbie Avenue stations.

Higbie Avenue station 
Higbie Avenue station was built in 1908 as one of two replacements for a former South Side Railroad of Long Island station on Springfield Road known as Springfield station, a name also given to a former station on the Montauk Branch which itself was renamed Springfield Gardens Station. SSRLI's Springfield station existed from October 28, 1867 to 1906. The newer station itself was named Springfield station until September 1927.

Higbie Avenue station always consisted of  a small shack on an embankment. Though it ran on the Atlantic Branch, it only served Far Rockaway Branch trains, however between 1950 and 1955 it also served Rockaway Beach Branch trains due to the 1950 fire on the bridge over Jamaica Bay. On October 15, 1958, the New York State Public Service Commission announced that the Long Island Rail Road (LIRR) had sought permission to eliminate agent service at the station. As part of a grade-crossing elimination project underway, the station was to be relocated to Farmers Boulevard.

It finally closed on February 2, 1960, when the Atlantic Branch grade elimination project was complete.

References

Former Long Island Rail Road stations in New York City
Railway stations in the United States opened in 1908
Railway stations closed in 1960
1908 establishments in New York City
1960 disestablishments in New York (state)